The Nikaraksha class of bucket dredger is a pair of yardcraft built by Mazagon Dock Limited, Mumbai for the Indian Navy. 

See also
Amrit-class victualling barge

References

Auxiliary ships of the Indian Navy